Pierre Louis Boiteau (3 December 1911 – 1 September 1980) was a French botanist. The botanist, Lucile Allorge, is his daughter.

References

20th-century French botanists
1911 births
1980 deaths
Deaths from cancer in France